Pupina difficilis is a species of land snail with an operculum, a terrestrial gastropod mollusk in the family Pupinidae. This species is endemic to Palau.

References 

 Discoverlife info

Fauna of Palau
Pupina
Endemic fauna of Palau
Taxonomy articles created by Polbot